Kenneth Robb was an American football coach. He served as the head football coach at Culver–Stockton College in Canton, Missouri from 1954 to 1961 and Central Missouri State College—know known as the University of Central Missouri —in Warrensburg, Missouri from 1963 to 1965, compiling a career college football coaching record of 36–55–7.

Head coaching record

References

Year of birth missing
Year of death missing
Central Missouri Mules football coaches
Culver–Stockton Wildcats football coaches